Martín Montoya Torralbo (born 14 April 1991) is a Spanish professional footballer who plays as a right-back for La Liga club Real Betis.

He started his career with Barcelona, making his first appearance for the first team in 2011 and going on to win seven major titles as a backup. In La Liga, he also represented Betis (two spells) and Valencia, totalling 123 matches and three goals over ten seasons. In addition, he spent two years in the Premier League with Brighton & Hove Albion.

With Spain, Montoya won two European Under-21 Championships.

Club career

Barcelona
Born in Gavà, Barcelona, Catalonia, Montoya started playing football for hometown club CF Gavà, moving to FC Barcelona's youth system, La Masia, at the age of 8. After progressing through its ranks, he was promoted to the B team in 2009.

In the 2009–10 season, Montoya contributed 23 games as the Luis Enrique-led side returned to the Segunda División after an 11-year absence. He made his debut for the main squad on 26 February 2011, coming on as a substitute for Adriano in the last five minutes of a 3–0 away win against RCD Mallorca.

Towards the end of March 2011, rumours surfaced linking Montoya with Valencia CF, who was willing to pay the €3 million buy-out clause of the player. On 30 April, he made his first start for Barcelona in a 2–1 La Liga loss at Real Sociedad, suffering a broken clavicle in the early minutes of the match and being sidelined for the rest of the campaign.

Montoya again spent the vast majority of 2011–12 with the reserves. His first start for the first team occurred on 12 January 2012, in a 2–1 away victory over CA Osasuna in the Copa del Rey (6–1 on aggregate). Due to injury to Dani Alves he played in the final of the domestic cup, featuring the full 90 minutes in a 3–0 defeat of Athletic Bilbao; he had previously scored his first official goal on 6 December 2011, helping the hosts beat FC BATE Borisov 4–0 in the group stage of the UEFA Champions League.

Montoya scored his second goal as a professional on 1 June 2013, netting the third in a 4–1 home win against Málaga CF. He finished the season with 24 appearances in all competitions, totalling 1,678 minutes of action.

Montoya expressed his desire to leave the Camp Nou in December 2014, after the signing of another player for his position, also-Brazilian Douglas. He eventually stayed until the end of the campaign, which ended in treble conquest, his only major contribution being playing 80 minutes in a 3–1 victory at Paris Saint-Germain F.C. in the Champions League quarter-finals.

In July 2015, Montoya joined Inter Milan on a season-long loan for €1.3 million, with the option of extending the deal for another year pending appearances. The Italian club also had an obligation to buy him for €6 million, if he played 33% of all competitive matches during his tenure and each appearance amounted to at least 30 minutes.

On 1 February 2016, still owned by Barcelona, Montoya signed with Real Betis until 30 June.

Valencia
On 1 August 2016, Montoya signed a four-year deal with Valencia following the expiration of his contract with Barcelona. He played 29 matches and scored twice in his first season, with his team finally ranking in 12th place.

Brighton & Hove Albion
On 9 August 2018, Montoya signed with English club Brighton & Hove Albion for €7 million, subject to international clearance. He made his debut in the Premier League ten days later, playing 90 minutes in the 3–2 home win over Manchester United. He added four appearances in their run in the FA Cup, including the semi-final loss to Manchester City at Wembley; he played 25 league games during the season, as the team secured their division status for the second time a row.

Betis
Montoya returned to Spain and Betis on 25 August 2020, after agreeing to a four-year contract. His spell at the Estadio Benito Villamarín was marred by injury problems.

International career
In 2011, Montoya earned his first cap for the Spain under-21 team. He was picked by manager Luis Milla to the squad that competed in that year's UEFA European Championship, and started in all the games as the national side won the tournament in Denmark.

On 25 August 2011, Montoya was selected for the first time to the full side by coach Vicente del Bosque, for fixtures against Chile and Liechtenstein; however, he did not take the field on either match. He then played twice at the 2012 Summer Olympics.

Montoya also represented Catalonia, making his debut in 2011. On his sixth cap, on 25 March 2019, he helped them to a 2–1 friendly win over Venezuela.

Personal life
Montoya lost his mother Rosa María at the age of 17, to breast cancer. He stated that this event helped shape his career as a footballer.

Career statistics

Honours
Barcelona B
Segunda División B play-offs: 2010

Barcelona
La Liga: 2010–11, 2012–13, 2014–15
Copa del Rey: 2011–12, 2014–15
Supercopa de España: 2013
UEFA Champions League: 2014–15

Spain U19
UEFA European Under-19 Championship runner-up: 2010

Spain U21
UEFA European Under-21 Championship: 2011, 2013

References

External links

1991 births
Living people
People from Gavà
Sportspeople from the Province of Barcelona
Spanish footballers
Footballers from Catalonia
Association football defenders
La Liga players
Segunda División players
Segunda División B players
CF Gavà players
FC Barcelona Atlètic players
FC Barcelona players
Real Betis players
Valencia CF players
Serie A players
Inter Milan players
Premier League players
Brighton & Hove Albion F.C. players
UEFA Champions League winning players
Spain youth international footballers
Spain under-21 international footballers
Spain under-23 international footballers
Olympic footballers of Spain
Footballers at the 2012 Summer Olympics
Catalonia international footballers
Spanish expatriate footballers
Expatriate footballers in Italy
Expatriate footballers in England
Spanish expatriate sportspeople in Italy
Spanish expatriate sportspeople in England